Alignan-du-Vent is a commune in the Hérault department in the Occitanie region in southern France.

Population

Births
Alignan-du-Vent was the birthplace of:
Léon Azéma (1888–1978), French architect

See also
Communes of the Hérault department

References

Communes of Hérault